is a Japanese gravure model, actress, erotic dancer and AV idol.

Life and career

Early career
After dropping out of school, at age 15 Komukai began her career as a "gravure model" and a swimsuit model. In 2001 she had a guest-star role as a schoolgirl in the Nippon Television comedy . For her appearances as a gravure idol and on television, she was selected as a "Fuji Television Visual Queen" for 2001. The next year she starred in the anime series , voicing the part of the boy hero Sho Kazamatsuri, broadcast in 2002 in 39 episodes on the Animax TV network. In 2003 Komukai starred in her first movie, the horror film  directed by Atsushi Shimizu and released to theaters on July 19, 2003.

Komukai was cast as Princess Freezia in the Toei's August 2003 theatrical release of Bakuryū Sentai Abaranger Deluxe: Abare Summer Is Freezing Cold!, part of the long-running Super Sentai series. She returned to TV work starring as high school girl Rion Kano in the TV Tokyo romantic supernatural series  which was broadcast from April to June 2004. She also starred in a very different role as the female sword fighter Sayuri in the period action drama , which reached theaters in November 2004.

In addition to modeling and acting, Komukai also appeared at Japanese video game events and eventually became acquainted with Metal Gear creator Hideo Kojima, appearing as a guest on his HIDECHAN! Radio show in 2006.

AV debut
In October 2011 she entered the adult video (AV) industry as an exclusive actress for the company Alice Japan with the video AV Actress Minako Komukai. It was reported that she was being paid 100 million yen (nearly US$1 million) for a five-film contract. Her AV debut film was a huge commercial success, selling over 200,000 copies in a field where 10,000 copies constitute a hit. In early 2012 with AV sales generally declining due to internet competition, other adult studios were also looking to sign big names from other areas of entertainment, a so-called "Minako Komukai effect." Komukai began appearing in videos for a new studio, Moodyz, in July 2014. Her first video for Moodyz, titled Anal Bukkake Fuck Now!, won the Grand Prix award and the Super Heavyweight Class First Place award at the AV Open 2014 competition in November 2014.

Legal issues
In September 2008, Komukai's agent  announced that they were cancelling her exclusive contract because her poor health, mental instability, and absences for the past few years had made it impossible for them to continue their support. In November of that same year, Komukai stirred the gravure world with her allegations that the industry was full of seedy types who attempt to solicit prostitution work out of the models although she denied any participation in prostitution activities herself. 

In January 2009, she was arrested on drug charges. She was convicted in Tokyo District Court in February 2009 of drug law violations for using methamphetamines and was sentenced to 18 months in prison, suspended for three years. At the trial, Komukai said she had been using drugs since mid-2007 under coercion from the man she had been dating. Komukai published a tell-all autobiography in November 2009 titled  in which she talks about dropping out of high school, early sexual activity, and her drug problems.

Komukai starred in the 2010 Toei film  directed by Yusuke Narita. This was a sequel to Toei's sadomasochistic-themed 2004 film Flower and Snake, which was itself a remake of the classic 1974 version (Flower and Snake). The Japan Times reviewer's opinion of her acting abilities was not flattering. In 2010, Komukai started a career as a stripper.

When Tokyo police broke up a group of Japanese and Iranian drug dealers in October 2010, they found Komukai's name listed as a customer and in February 2011, they issued a warrant for her arrest. Komukai had left Japan by that time and was in Manila. In a February 14 interview in Manila, she denied the drug allegations, said she was "not afraid of getting arrested" and would soon be returning to Japan. Komukai was arrested for a second time on drug charges for alleged possession of methamphetamines at Tokyo's Narita International Airport when she returned from Manila on February 25, 2011. In March 2011, Komukai, who denied she was a customer of the drug gang, was released due to lack of evidence.

In February 2015, Komukai was arrested for drug possession for the third time. The arrest, made by narcotics officers at her apartment in the Ebisu, Shibuya area of Tokyo, was for 0.1 grams of methamphetamine. It was reported that Komukai admitted to the allegations. Friends said that she had seemed distracted since the November AV Open 2014 awards and had cancelled work and taken time off.

Filmography

Theatrical Films
  (2003)
 Bakuryū Sentai Abaranger Deluxe: Abare Summer Is Freezing Cold! (2003)
  (2004)
  (2004)
  (2005)
  (2010)

Television
  (2001)
  (2002)
 Vampire Host (2004)

Adult videos (AV)

References

External links 

 
 

Japanese gravure models
Japanese pornographic film actresses
Japanese people convicted of drug offenses
Japanese female erotic dancers
1985 births
Actresses from Kanagawa Prefecture
Living people
Models from Kanagawa Prefecture